Chil-Ustun Cave also known as Aravan Cave is located in the Southwest of Kyrgyzstan in the Osh Mountains, composed of Paleozoic limestones, in 3.5 km from Aravan, Kyrgyzstan. It is a protected natural monument. The cave belongs to the group of Karst caves of outlier mountains to the west of Osh.

The entrance to the cave forms a 15 meter tall and approximately 25 meter wide arc. The cave is 380 meters long  or up to 350 meters according to another source. It is located in a rock formation at 1100 meters above sea level. The entrance is located on a steep, oblique rock face.

The cave's existence has been known since mediaeval times as attested by Arabic inscriptions on the walls.

The cave consists of 3 chambers of different sizes, connected with corridors and narrow openings. The largest chamber is 85 m X 40 m X 20 m in size.

Inside the cave, stalactites and stalagmites (columns) reach heights of over 50 meters. These forms vary in color, from white and cream to dark brown.

References

Caves of Kyrgyzstan
Osh Region
Natural monuments of Kyrgyzstan